The 2010–11 Croatian First Football League (officially known as T-Com Prva HNL for sponsorship reasons) was the 20th season of the Croatian First Football League, the national championship for men's association football teams in Croatia, since its establishment in 1992. It began on 23 July 2010 and ended on 21 May 2011. Dinamo Zagreb were the defending champions, having won their 12th championship title (and fifth consecutive title) the previous season, and they defended the title again.

Format
Amid a considerable amount of criticism, the Association of Prva HNL Clubs had decided to expand the league from 12 to 16 clubs for the 2009–10 season. However, while the league format is regulated by the association of member clubs, each club must also obtain a football licence for top-flight competitions issued by the Croatian Football Federation and which applies criteria prescribed by UEFA, which are mainly concerned with the standard of their grounds and clubs' financial stability.

On 5 April 2010 only four clubs had met the requirements needed for these licenses - Dinamo Zagreb, Inter Zaprešić, Slaven Belupo and NK Zagreb. Clubs whose requests were rejected were allowed to appeal by 15 April, and the licensing department of the Croatian Football Federation was required to officially respond to these appeals by 3 May 2010.

In addition to this, only four Druga HNL clubs had officially requested a license, e.g. only four clubs expressed interest in competing in the 2010–11 Prva HNL in case they win promotion - RNK Split, Hrvatski dragovoljac, Solin and Mosor.
According to the official Prva HNL statute at the time, if less than 16 clubs managed to obtain licenses by the beginning of the 2010–11 season, the format would be automatically reduced to 12 clubs. In such a scenario the five bottom-placed teams from the previous season would be relegated and only the winners of the Druga HNL would get promoted to top level.

On 6 May 2010 the Croatian Football Federation announced that, after the appeals had been resolved, a total of 16 clubs were granted top level licences:

Cibalia
Croatia Sesvete (finished 16th)
Dinamo Zagreb
Hajduk Split
Hrvatski Dragovoljac (2. HNL)
Inter Zaprešić
Istra 1961
Karlovac
Lokomotiva
Osijek
Rijeka
Šibenik
Slaven Belupo
RNK Split (2. HNL)
Zadar
NK Zagreb (finished 14th)

(Note: Clubs listed in italics obtained licences for grounds owned by other clubs as their own grounds were found unsuitable for top level matches.)

Prva HNL teams Međimurje and Varteks were not granted licences, due to financial difficulties at those clubs and accumulated debts to employees and players, with Varteks owing some 550,000 kuna (€76,000) and Međimurje 90,000 kuna (€12,500).

Since a total of 16 clubs were granted licences, including Croatia Sesvete who must be relegated at the end of the previous season, the retention of the 16-club format was in question for the 2010–11 season. It was also announced that the licensing process had officially ended on 1 May 2010. Međimurje, Varteks and other clubs which failed to get licences were allowed to try to obtain them through arbitration, and the process had to be completed by 31 May 2010, when the Croatian Football Federation was required to submit the list of top-flight clubs for the 2010–11 season to UEFA. On 21 May 2010 it was announced that Varteks and Međimurje were granted top level licences for next season. This meant that the 16-club format would be retained in the 2010–11 season.

Also, in June, NK Varteks changed their name to NK Varaždin because their main sponsor, fashion company Varteks, were not capable of sponsoring the club any longer due to its own financial troubles.

Future format changes
On 5 July 2010 the CFF Executive Committee reached a decision, (confirmed by the CFF Assembly on 14 July 2010), to reduce the number of teams in Prva HNL. The league will be reduced to 12 teams in the 2011–12 season, and then to 10 team format, expected to be introduced for either the 2012–13 or 2013–14 season. That means that the number of relegation spots was increased from 3 to 5 for the current 2010–11 season, and only the 2010–11 Druga HNL champions will be promoted. However, CFF Assembly on 17 December 2010 delayed the execution of this changes by one year. Instead, the league will stay at 16 teams with only the last three teams being relegated and the first three teams from 2010–11 Druga HNL earning promotion (if they are granted with top level license). In case of 16 teams not acquiring top level license, format with 12 teams will be applied.

On 4 April 2011, CFF announced that the first stage of licensing procedure for 2011–12 season was completed. For the 2011–12 Prva HNL, only eight clubs were issued a top level license: Dinamo Zagreb, Hajduk Split, Inter Zaprešić, Istra 1961, Lokomotiva, Slaven Belupo, Varaždin and NK Zagreb. Out of these eight, only Lokomotiva and NK Zagreb weren't issued a license for participating in UEFA competitions. In the second stage of licensing procedure clubs that didn't get a license appealed on the decision and provided new facts and arguments. On 4 May 2011, it was announced that all remaining Prva HNL clubs were granted top level license. Additionally, Cibalia, Rijeka and RNK Split obtained a license for UEFA competitions. Only three teams from Druga HNL acquired the top level license: Dugopolje, Gorica and Lučko, where the latter two are set to play outside of their home venues.

The club that accepts participation in Prva HNL or Druga HNL in 2011–12 season, and has secured that right on terms of ranking and acquired license, must confirm their participation in written form no later than 6 June 2011. If a club doesn't submit such a claim or backs out later, they will be demoted to county league. The 2011–12 Prva HNL season is scheduled to start on 23 July 2011.

Teams 
Although the bottom three clubs should have been relegated at the end of the 2009–10 season, problems with licensing have reduced this number. However, the Prva HNL Statute explicitly states that the bottom-placed team must be relegated, which will be Croatia Sesvete. Since only two second division clubs met the requirements for top level football, 14th-placed NK Zagreb will not be relegated and the 15th-placed club Međimurje will be replaced with Hrvatski Dragovoljac, the third-placed team in Druga HNL.

2009–10 Druga HNL winners RNK Split have secured a promotion spot in the on 2 May 2010. This will mark their return to top flight after 49 years, having been relegated from the 1960–61 Yugoslav First League. Hrvatski Dragovoljac was returned to Prva HNL after spending 9 years in lower levels, as their last top-flight spell had ended at the end of the 2001–02 season.

Stadia and locations
The following is the updated list of stadia for which top level licences have been obtained as of 21 May 2010. Five out of the eighteen licensed clubs had obtained licences to use other clubs' stadia as their own grounds had been found unsuitable for top flight matches but only Lokomotiva will end the season using stadium of other club because Međimurje dropt out to second division, RNK Split was given permission to play their home games at their own stadion, Istra 1961 was given permission to play their home games in their home town until their own stadium will be finished with renovation, and Hrvatski Dragovoljac is also waiting for its own stadium to be finished with renovation.

Just before the start of the season Istra 1961 was given permission to play their home games at the Stadion Veruda in Pula until the end of renovation of its own Stadion Aldo Drosina in Pula. They will play their first game at Stadion Aldo Drosina in February in 19. round against Dragovoljac. Originally, they were supposed to play their home games at the Kantrida stadium in Rijeka. Before their first home game RNK Split was given permission to play their home games at their own Stadion Park mladeži in Split. Originally, they were supposed to play their home games at the Poljud stadium in Split. Before their first home game Hrvatski Dragovoljac was given permission to play their home games at stadium in Kranjčevićeva in Zagreb where they continued playing their home games until renovation of their own Stadion NŠC Stjepan Spajić stadium ended. They have played their first home game at their own stadium in 18. round against Rijeka. Originally, they were supposed to play their home games at the Maksimir stadium in Zagreb.

Personnel and kits

Managerial changes

League table

Results

Top goalscorers
As of 21 May 2011; Source: Prva-HNL

Transfers
List of Croatian football transfers summer 2010

See also
2010 Croatian Football Super Cup
2010–11 Croatian Football Cup
2010–11 Croatian Second Football League

References

External links
Official website 
Prva HNL at UEFA.com

2010-11
Cro
Prva